NA-79 Mandi Bahauddin-I is a constituency for the National Assembly of Pakistan.

Members of Parliament

2018-2022: NA-85 Mandi Bahauddin-I

Election 2002 

General elections were held on 10 Oct 2002. Ijaz Ahmed Chaudhry of PML-Q won by 70,675 votes.

Election 2008 

General elections were held on 18 Feb 2008. Muhammad Tariq Tarar of PPP won by 73,981 votes.

Election 2013 

General elections were held on 11 May 2013. Muhammad Ijaz Ahmed Chaudhary (independent) won by 85,578 votes and became the  member of National Assembly.

Ijaz Chaudhary left his National Assembly seat and joined PTI on November 29, 2014.
He was disqualified in fake degree case by the Supreme Court of Pakistan on 14 April 2015.

By-election 2015
By elections were held on 8 June 2015 and Mumtaz Ahmed Tarar of PML-N won the slot with 70,638 votes.

Election 2018 
General elections were held on 25 July 2018.

See also
NA-78 Gujranwala-V
NA-80 Mandi Bahauddin-II

References

External links 
 Election result's official website

Constituencies of Punjab, Pakistan